Adam Lundqvist (born 20 March 1994), sometimes spelled Adam Lundkvist, is a Swedish footballer who plays for Major League Soccer club Austin FC as a left back. He previously played for in the Allsvenska for IF Elfsborg, where they won the Svenska Cupen, and in MLS for the Houston Dynamo, helping the club win the U.S. Open Cup.  He has twice been capped by the Swedish national team and represented Sweden at the 2016 Summer Olympics.

Club career

Nyköpings BIS 
Lundqvist began his career with local club Nyköpings BIS. After joining the youth ranks in 2006, Lundqvist joined the first team in 2010. He made one appearance in the preliminary round of the Svenska Cupen before making his professional debut on 27 March 2010, coming on as a sub in Nyköpings BIS's 5–2 defeat to BK Forward in round 1 of the Svenska Cupen.  Lundqvist made his league debut on 16 May 2010 when he came on as a sub against Örebro SK Ungdomsklubb

IF Elfsborg 
In 2011, Lundqvist joined Allsvenskan club IF Elfsborg. He would spend time with the Elfsborg youth teams before making his first team debut on 25 September 2013, coming on as a sub in a league match with IF Brommapojkarna. On 7 November 2013, Lundqvist made his Europa League debut, getting the start against Danish side Esbjerg. Lundqvist helped Elfsborg when their 3rd ever Svenska Cupen by featuring 6 times during the 2013-14 version of the competition, however he didn't appear in the final. 2014 also saw Lundqvist convert from a midfielder to a left back. He scored his first goal for Elfsborg in a 2-0 Allsvenskan win over Kalmar FF on 17 August 2014.

Houston Dynamo 
On 26 April 2018, Major League Soccer club Houston Dynamo signed Lundqvist on a full transfer using targeted allocation money. He played one game on loan with the Dynamo's USL affiliate club Rio Grande Valley FC to regain match fitness. He made his Dynamo debut on 30 May against Real Salt Lake. In his debut as well as in many games in his first year with the Dynamo, Lundqvist played right back instead of his natural left back position due to starter AJ DeLaGarza being injured and veteran DaMarcus Beasley occupying the starting left back spot. He helped the Dynamo win the 2018 US Open Cup, their first ever, by making 2 appearances and picking up 2 assists in the competition, including a game winning assist on 18 June against Minnesota United.  It was a poor season in the league however, with Houston finishing 9th in the Western Conference and missing out on the playoffs, with Lundqvist making 16 appearances and recording 1 assist.

On 2 March 2019, with DaMarcus Beasley resting for their CONCACAF Champions League match, Lundqvist got the start for the Dynamo's first league game of the 2019 season. Head coach Wilmer Cabrera's decision paid off in the 60th minute when Lundqvist sent in a cross that Mauro Manotas hit past goalkeeper Nick Rimando to give Houston a 1–1 draw with Real Salt Lake. Lundqvist would get the start in the Dynamo's next MLS match, a 2–1 win over the Montreal Impact, while Beasley again was rested for the CCL matches.  On 12 March, Lundqvist was subbed on in the 19th minute of Houston's 2nd leg Champions League fixture with Tigres UANL when Beasley suffered an injury. Beasley was ruled out for 4–6 weeks, allowing Lundqvist to become the starting left back for the first significant stretch since he arrived in Houston.  Once Beasley had recovered from his injury, Lundqvist still featured prominently at left back and filled in at right back at the end of the season after DeLaGarza was injured.  He ended the season with 28 appearances and 4 assists in MLS play, but Houston struggled as a team, missing out on the playoffs again.

2020 saw Lundqvist become the first choice left back for new head coach Tab Ramos following Beasley's retirement after the 2019 season.  In a shortened season due to the COVID-19 pandemic, Lundqvist started 21 of Houston's 23 games, with the only 2 he missed being the result of a suspension for a violent tackle.  The season was poor for the Dynamo as a whole, finishing last in the Western Conference and missing out on the playoffs for the 3rd straight season.

On 25 March 2021, Lundqvist signed a contract extension through the 2022 season, with team options for 2023 and 2024.  After starting the first 8 matches of the season, Lundqvist only started 4 of the next 11 games, with one of those starts being as a winger rather than as a fullback, as Lundqvist competed with Sam Junqua for the starting left back spot.  Lundqvist reclaimed his starting spot by matchday 20, starting the next 7 games before suffering a knee injury on 18 September during a 3–2 win over Texas Derby rivals FC Dallas.  After missing a month, he returned to action on 20 October, coming on as a halftime substitute in a 3–0 loss to the LA Galaxy before playing the full 90 minutes for Houston's final 3 matches.  Lundqvist ended the season with 25 appearances and 2 assists as the Dynamo finished last in the Conference for the second straight season and missed the playoffs for the 4th straight year.

The 2022 season saw Lundqvist record 5 assists in 31 appearances, 30 of them starts.  He tied with Darwin Quintero for the team lead in assists in MLS play.  Despite a strong season from Lundqvist, Houston missed the playoffs for the 5th consecutive season, finishing 13th in the West.

Austin FC 
On 10 January 2023, Lundqvist was traded to Copa Tejas rivals Austin FC in exchange for $500,000 in General Allocation Money.

International career 
Lundqvist has represented Sweden at various youth levels as well as at the 2016 Summer Olympics, where he started all 3 of the group stage matches. He made his senior team debut on 6 January in a friendly against Estonia.

Personal life 
Lundqvist played ice hockey as a kid.  He has said that former Sweden international Klas Ingesson, who was his coach at Elfsborg, was his favorite player and served as a father figure when Lundqvist moved to Elfsborg. Lundqvist and his father are fans of English Premier League club Liverpool.

Career statistics

Honors 
IF Elfsborg

Svenska Cupen: 2013-14

Houston Dynamo

US Open Cup: 2018

References

External links
 
 
 

1994 births
Living people
Allsvenskan players
Association football defenders
Association football midfielders
Austin FC players
Footballers at the 2016 Summer Olympics
Houston Dynamo FC players
IF Elfsborg players
Major League Soccer players
Olympic footballers of Sweden
People from Nyköping Municipality
Rio Grande Valley FC Toros players
Sportspeople from Södermanland County
Swedish expatriate footballers
Swedish expatriate sportspeople in the United States
Swedish footballers
Sweden international footballers
Sweden under-21 international footballers
Sweden youth international footballers
USL Championship players